The Canton of Bains-les-Bains is a former French administrative and electoral grouping of communes in the Vosges département of eastern France and in the region of Lorraine. It was disbanded following the French canton reorganisation which came into effect in March 2015. It consisted of 12 communes, which joined the canton of Le Val-d'Ajol in 2015. It had 3,576 inhabitants (2012).

Positioned within the arrondissement of Épinal, the canton had its administrative centre at Bains-les-Bains.

Composition
The Canton of Bains-les-Bains comprised the following 12 communes:

 Bains-les-Bains 
 Fontenoy-le-Château 
 Grandrupt-de-Bains 
 Gruey-lès-Surance 
 Harsault 
 Hautmougey 
 La Haye 
 Le Magny 
 Montmotier
 Trémonzey 
 Vioménil 
 Les Voivres

References

Bains-les-Bains
2015 disestablishments in France
States and territories disestablished in 2015